The Irish Republican Socialist Committees of North America (IRSCNA) was founded at a conference held March 23–25, 1984 in Saint Paul, Minnesota as a support group for the Irish Republican Socialist Movement. In 1998, it was recognized as the North American section of the IRSM. For most of its history, the IRSCNA was based in San Francisco, California, but is now based in Salt Lake City, Utah. The IRSCNA contributes financially to the Irish Republican Socialist Party.

History
There had been discussion of whether to establish a distinct, partisan support group for the IRSM from at least 1981, as October of that year was the first time someone was allowed to join the Irish Republican Socialist Party while resident in North America, when activists Caitlin Hines and Peter Lorenzen were admitted to the party, but it was agreed that a broad front type of formation best suited the needs of the IRSM at the time. The IRSP's leadership favored pursuit of support through work in broad front organizations. As a result, a network of IRSP supporters and members developed within the H-Block/Armagh Committees of the U.S. and Canada.

With the growing and increasingly overt hostility of the Provisional Republican Movement (Provisional Sinn Féin and the Provisional Irish Republican Army) toward the IRSM, it was determined by supporters in North America that it was no longer effective to attempt to work exclusively through broad front formations and the Ard Chomhairle (National Executive) of the IRSP was petitioned for permission to establish a distinct support group for the IRSM.

Brigid Makowski from Derry, then the treasurer of the IRSP and an elected Shannon Town councillor, represented the IRSP at the IRSCNA's founding convention. Delegates to the founding convention came from New York City, Washington, DC, San Francisco, Minneapolis, Minnesota, and Eugene, Oregon, with fraternal greetings received from Vancouver, British Columbia and Regina, Saskatchewan.

Formal IRSP sanction and mandate was provided by the Ard Chomhairle of the IRSP in a letter from the IRSP's then General Secretary in 1986 and recognition of the exclusivity of the IRSCNA's mandate for North America was reiterated by the Ard Chomhairle in 1987.

The IRSCNA grew steadily, creating in new chapters in the states of Florida, Arizona, Virginia, Washington, Connecticut, New Hampshire, and Ohio, as well as the Canadian provinces of Quebec and Ontario.

The Irish Political Prisoners Children's Fund was founded by members of the IRSCNA and for a number of years IRSCNA members worked within that organization to provide trips to North America for the children of Irish National Liberation Army prisoners of war. One of the most notable of these trips was the stay by the two daughters of slain INLA volunteer Ronnie Bunting to the Pine Ridge Indian Reservation, which served as the basis for the documentary film, We Are a River Flowing.

In 1987 the IRSCNA helped to establish relations with the government of Libya for the IRSM and in 1988 two IRSCNA members traveled to Libya on behalf of the movement. Members of the IRSCNA also represented the IRSP at a political prisoners' conference held in San Juan, Puerto Rico, as well as numerous events within the United States and Canada.

Between 1985 and 1992, the IRSCNA published its own quarterly periodical, Irish Workers' Republic, which provided the IRSM with valuable public exposure, during the difficult years for the movement, following its near destruction by the attacks launched against it by the Irish People's Liberation Organisation.

At the 1998 IRSP Ard Fheis, it was resolved that the IRSCNA would be recognized as a component section of the IRSM and its members would be accorded the full rights of members of the IRSP, including participation in closed sessions of an Ard Fheis and voting rights at an Ard Fheis.

In 2005, the IRSCNA was reorganized under a collective leadership called the Coordinating Committee. Co-founder and then North American Coordinator of the IRSCNA and co-International Secretary of the IRSP Peter Lorenzen and two members published a public resignation letter critical of  the IRSP's Ard Comhairle, and the Ard Chomhairle responded by expelling those who signed the letter for attacking the movement.

Since reorganizing, the IRSCNA held an Ard Fheis in Kansas City in 2008 and Chicago in 2009.

The organization has cumainn (branches) in Detroit, Michigan, Minneapolis, Minnesota., and Salt Lake City, Utah.

In 2010, it was decided that only members of the Coordinating Committee would also have dual membership in the IRSP. The Coordinating Committee is composed of Tj Ó Conchúir and John Shook.

See also 
 Irish Republican Socialist Party
 Irish National Liberation Army

References

External links
Irish Republican Socialist Committees of North America Facebook page

Irish republican organisations
Irish Republican Socialist Movement
Irish-American history